This is an overview of the progression of the World track cycling record of the women's 3000m individual pursuit as recognised by the Union Cycliste Internationale (UCI).

Progression

Amateurs (1964–1992)

Open (from 1993)

References

Track cycling world record progressions